The City of Oakleigh was a local government area about  southeast of Melbourne, the state capital of Victoria, Australia.

History

Oakleigh was initially part of the Oakleigh Road District in January 1857, which became the Shire of Oakleigh in December 1871. Parts of the Central and South Ridings were severed to create the Oakleigh Borough on 13 March 1891. The remainder was renamed the Shire of Mulgrave in 1897, and went on to become the City of Waverley.

On 16 April 1913, Oakleigh annexed part of the City of Caulfield, and went on to be declared a town on 19 February 1924, and a city on 2 August 1927. It annexed part of the Shire of Mulgrave on 15 December 1949, which became the East Ward, and on 1 October 1959, Oakleigh incorporated small areas of land from all surrounding areas.

On 15 December 1994, the City of Oakleigh was abolished, and along with the City of Waverley, was merged into the newly created City of Monash. The suburb of Clayton South was transferred to the newly created City of Kingston, to join parts of the former Cities of Chelsea, Moorabbin and Springvale.

Council chambers
When the rebuilt Oakleigh Mechanics' Institute was opened in July 1906, the council chambers were relocated there. This building, now known as Oakleigh Hall, is located in Drummond Street. In 1921, the chambers were relocated to a purpose-built facility in Atherton Road, which currently houses the Monash Seminar & Training Centre.

Wards

The City of Oakleigh was subdivided into four wards on 1 April 1985, each electing three councillors:
 North Ward
 South Ward
 East Ward
 West Ward

Suburbs
 Chadstone
 Clarinda (shared with the City of Moorabbin)
 Clayton
 Clayton South
 Hughesdale
 Huntingdale
 Monash University (Clayton campus)
 Oakleigh*
 Oakleigh East
 Oakleigh South (shared with the City of Moorabbin)

* Council seat.

Population

* Estimate in the 1958 Victorian Year Book.
* Includes all territory added in 1959.

References

External links
 Victorian Places - Oakleigh

Oakleigh
1891 establishments in Australia
City of Monash
1994 disestablishments in Australia